Kwinana bus station is a Transperth bus station located next to the Kwinana Marketplace Shopping Centre in Kwinana Town Centre. It has 10 stands and is served by five Transperth routes operated by Transdev WA.

The original Kwinana bus station opened in 1975–76. Located on Rockingham Road in Kwinana Beach near the Thomas Road intersection, the original bus station closed on the commissioning of the Kwinana bus Station and demolished. The new station was initially named the Kwinana bus station. It was renamed to Kwinana Hub bus station when the adjacent shopping centre was named the Kwinana Hub and when the Mandurah Line opens in end-2007. It was renamed back to Kwinana bus station when the adjacent shopping centre was renamed.

Bus routes

References

Bus stations in Perth, Western Australia
City of Kwinana